Slimka (born Cassim Sall; 30 April 1994), is a Swiss rapper. Born in Geneva, Switzerland to an Italian-German mother and a Senegalese-Malian father, he is considered one of the principal representatives of French Swiss rap along with his fellow rappers who form the Genevan Superwak Clique: Di-Meh, Makala and Varnish la Piscine. He credits Di-Meh and Makala for his continued enthusiasm in making music and cites them as his biggest motivators.

Life 
In his youth and throughout his adolescence, Cassim played soccer before later moving from sports towards focusing on modelling and rapping. Since 2014, he has done features alongside members of the Superwak Clique, a collective of Genevan hip-hop artists with two prominent members being Di-Meh and Makala. After these first song features, appearing in concert with the Superwak Clique, and on Makala's Varaignée, pt. 1 mixtape, he quickly cultivated his unique image and stood out for his unique voice and aggressive style of rapping. In April 2017, SLimka released his first project titled No Bad, Vol. 1. His mixtape did relatively well, reaching number 35 on the Schweizer Hitparade in the first week of its release. The following year, he released the second part of the mixtape No Bad, Vol. 2. The project could be considered a success for a rising artist as it brought the Superwak Clique to greater prominence in Switzerland and was 25th on the Schweizer Hitparade.

In 2020 he released the EP Tunnel Vision Prelude that, as its name indicates, precedes the release of his first album named Tunnel Vision. The promotion of the album began with the release of two singles, Headshot and Rainbow in early 2021.

Discography 
Albums
 Tunnel Vision (2021)

EPs
 Tunnel Vision Prelude (2020)
 6KLOP EP (2022)
Mixtapes
 No Bad, Vol. 1 (2017)
 No Bad, Vol. 2 (2018)

Singles
 Depeche Mode(feat. Makala & Di-Meh) (2018)
 SupSup (2018)
 Icy Twice(feat. Unknown) (2018)
 A Plus, A Ciao (feat. Di-Meh) (2018)
 Slide (2020)
 Headshot (2021)
 Rainbow (2021)
 Pression (feat. Cali P, Riga, MYKEL COSTA) (2022)
Level Up(feat. thaHomey) (2022)
 Best Life (2022)

References 

21st-century Swiss musicians
Swiss rappers
Living people
21st-century male musicians
Swiss people of Italian descent
Swiss people of German descent
Swiss people of Senegalese descent
Swiss people of Malian descent
1994 births